Griselda is an upcoming American crime drama streaming television miniseries directed by Andrés Baiz and produced by Eric Newman and Sofía Vergara. It is based on the life of Griselda Blanco, a notorious cocaine trafficker. The miniseries will premiere on Netflix.

Cast 

 Sofía Vergara as Griselda Blanco
 Alberto Guerra as Dario 
 Camilo Jiménez Varón as Rafael Cardona Salazar
 Vanessa Ferlito as Isabel 
 Alberto Ammann as Alberto Bravo 
 Christian Tappan as Arturo 
 Diego Trujillo as German Panesso
 Paulina Davila as Carmen 
 Gabriel Sloyer as Diaz 
 Juliana Aidén Martinez as June  
 Martin Rodriguez as Rivi  
 José Zúñiga as Amilcar  
 Maximiliano Hernández as Papo Mejia  
 Julieth Restrepo as Marta Ochoa
 David Piggott as Max Memelstein
Joe Finfera as Lawyer
 Orlando Pineda as Dixon Trujillo Blanco

Episodes

Production

Development 
On November 3, 2021, it was reported that Netflix is developing a new crime drama miniseries based on the life of drug trafficker Griselda Blanco. The miniseries will be produced by Eric Newman, Sofía Vergara, and  Luis Balaguer for Latin World Entertainment. Colombian native Baiz will direct all episodes. Doug Miro, Andrés Baiz and Carlo Bernard, who are all a part of the Narcos creative team, will executive produce and Ingrid Escajeda will serve as showrunner. On January 19, 2022, Netflix released a first look photo of Sofia Vergara as real-life drug queen pin Griselda Blanco from the upcoming limited series. The streamer also revealed 12 newly added cast members, including Vanessa Ferlito and Juliana Aidén Martinez. The cast also includes Alberto Guerra, Alberto Ammann, Christian Tappan, Diego Trujillo, Paulina Davila, Gabriel Sloyer, Martin Rodriguez, José Zúñiga, Maximiliano Hernández and Julieth Restrepo.

Filming 
Filming for the miniseries began on January 17, 2022 in Los Angeles.

References

External links 
 
 

English-language Netflix original programming
Spanish-language Netflix original programming
2020s American crime drama television series
2020s American drama television miniseries
American biographical series
Cultural depictions of Griselda Blanco
Drug Enforcement Administration in fiction
Serial drama television series
Television series about organized crime
Television series about illegal drug trade
Television shows filmed in Los Angeles
Television series set in the 1980s
Television shows about drugs
Works about Colombian drug cartels
Upcoming Netflix original programming
Upcoming drama television series